1185 Nikko, provisional designation , is a stony asteroid from the inner regions of the asteroid belt, approximately 10 kilometers in diameter. It was discovered on 17 November 1927 by Okuro Oikawa at the Tokyo Astronomical Observatory, Japan. The asteroid was named after the Japanese city of Nikkō.

Orbit and classification 

Nikko orbits the Sun in the inner main-belt at a distance of 2.0–2.5 AU once every 3 years and 4 months (1,222 days). Its orbit has an eccentricity of 0.11 and an inclination of 6° with respect to the ecliptic. Nikkos observation arc begins with its first used observation taken at Johannesburg Observatory in 1930, or 3 years after its official discovery observation at Tokyo.

Physical characteristics 

In both the Tholen and SMASS taxonomy, Nikko is a common stony S-type asteroid.

Rotation period 

Between 2004 and 2011, several rotational lightcurves of Nikko were obtained from photometric observations taken by astronomers Laurent Bernasconi, Hiromi and Hiroko Hamanowa, John Menke, Robert Stephens, as well as at the Palomar Transient Factory in California. Lightcurve analysis gave a rotation period between 3.781 and 3.792 hours with a brightness variation between 0.26 and 0.50 magnitude.

Diameter and albedo 

According to the survey carried out by the Japanese Akari satellite and NASA's Wide-field Infrared Survey Explorer with its subsequent NEOWISE mission, Nikko measures 8.347 and 12.56 kilometers in diameter, and its surface has an albedo of 0.370 and 0.164, respectively. The Collaborative Asteroid Lightcurve Link assumes a standard albedo for stony asteroids of 0.20 and calculates a diameter of 11.35 kilometers with an absolute magnitude of 12.09.

Naming 

This minor planet was named for the Japanese city of Nikkō, located in the Tochigi Prefecture of central Japan. The tourist resort is known for its Shinto shrine and a UNESCO World Heritage Site Nikkō Tōshō-gū. The official naming citation was published by Paul Herget in The Names of the Minor Planets in 1955.

References

External links 
 Asteroid Lightcurve Database (LCDB), query form (info )
 Dictionary of Minor Planet Names, Google books
 Asteroids and comets rotation curves, CdR – Observatoire de Genève, Raoul Behrend
 Discovery Circumstances: Numbered Minor Planets (1)-(5000) – Minor Planet Center
 
 

001185
Discoveries by Okuro Oikawa
Named minor planets
001185
001185
19271117